Allium mairei is an Asian species of wild onion in the Amaryllis family. It is native to Sichuan, Tibet, Yunnan, Myanmar, and Arunachal Pradesh.

Allium mairei produces clusters of thin bulbs. Scapes are up to 40 cm tall, sometimes 2 from the same plant. Leaves are usually a bit shorter than the scape. Flowers are pale red or reddish-purple. It grows in meadows, forests, and rock crevices.

References

mairei
Onions
Flora of China
Plants described in 1909
Flora of East Himalaya
Flora of Myanmar